Suave House Records, also known as The Legendary Suave House, is a record label in Houston, Texas, United States, founded by Tony Draper. The label was founded in 1990 when Draper was sixteen years old. Landmark independent releases from flagship act 8Ball & MJG made the company a heavyweight in the South and the Midwest. When Suave House signed national deals with Relativity Records and later Universal Records, 8Ball & MJG's efforts hit gold and platinum, as did their solo efforts. Suave House's other artists – Tela, South Circle, Mr. Mike, and Crime Boss – all carved out their own musical niches with music that alternated between gritty and street smooth, each selling hundreds of thousands of copies in the process.

In 1997, Suave House switched distributors from Relativity to Universal Records. The label's first release under new distribution was MJG's solo debut No More Glory.

In 1999, after Suave House's distribution deal was up with Universal Records, the label signed a distribution deal with Artemis Records and release a compilation album titled Suave House Presents.. Off Da Chain Vol. 1 which featured artists Lil Noah, Gillie Da Kid, 8Ball & MJG, Chico DeBarge, Joe, Psychodrama, Toni Hickman, and Ab Liva.

In 2007, Suave House Records also released an album from Def Jam's recording artist Rick Ross titled Rise to Power. The album was composed of older songs from Ross during his time at Suave House. Some tracks were remixed and produced by current Suave House's producer Jiggolo.

In April 2008, Suave House signed a joint venture deal with Koch.  The label's first release under the partnership was an 8Ball & MJG greatest hits album titled We Are the South.

Suave House Records today

In a March 2006 interview with XXL, Suave House CEO Tony Draper was asked about the vision of Suave House, "Why do you think Suave House II can compete in this day and age?" Draper said, 

"Because I believe that half of the niggas that you see out right now got their game from me. When Suave was doing their thing there was no Cash Money or No Limit. I respect what they've done. But a lot of niggas ain't real because they ain't paying respect. I knew the movement was big, my shit was solid. Because the only one thing that consumers know is that they love the product. They don't know that there is a nigga that's making them make songs like that. I was a family type nigga, we used to sit in the house making the shit from scratch. When the code was violated, that's when the music started changing."

Current artists 

Marly DuMarz
Amir Perry
T-Mix
X.O.
Asco Jones
Corey Morris
Park Avenue
Prince Newman
Scrilla

Current labels 
Royal Reign, LLC
Black Militia Entertainment

Former artists 
 Smooth Rhyme Criminals
 8Ball & MJG
 Tela
 South Circle (Mr. Mike and Thorough)
 Mr. Mike
 Crime Boss
 The Fedz
 Jazze Pha
 Young Twan
 Psychodrama
 Nuckle Heads
 Ill Hill Billies
 Rick Ross 
 Noah
 Gillie Da Kid
 Omar The Czar
 One Gud Cide
 Mr. Sche
 Baby S
 Big Duke
 Big Gee
 At-Large
 Big Mike
 Foulmouf

See also
Lists of record labels

References

External links 
The Legendary Suave House official website
Suave House 2 Myspace
The Legendary Suave House Twitter page
"Koch Records, Suave Records Ink Partnership" on Billboard
"Artemis Records May Ink Deal With Suave House" from CMJ New Music Report
"Suave House Records Returns With Jigg, Ice Cube Cosign" on HipHopDX
"New Rick Ross Album Coming, But Not On Def Jam" on Billboard
"Tony Draper: Unplugged!" on Tri-State Defender

American independent record labels
Gangsta rap record labels
Hip hop record labels
Companies based in Houston
Record labels established in 1990